Oenone (Œnone) is a female character in Greek mythology.

Oenone may also refer to:
"Oenone" (poem), by Alfred Lord Tennyson
Oenone, ancient name of Aegina, and island of Greece
215 Oenone, an asteroid
Oenone Wood (born 1980), retired Australian racing cyclist
Oenone Zero,  fictional character in the Mortal Engines Quartet by Philip Reeve
Œnone, character in the play Phèdre
Edith Somerville, middle name Œnone (1858–1949), Irish writer
Junonia oenone or blue pansy, a butterfly native to Africa